Nicholas Hunt was Commander-in-Chief Fleet.

Nicholas Hunt may also refer to:

Nicky Hunt (Nicholas Brett Hunt), English footballer
Nicholas de Hunt, MP for Coventry
Nicholas Hunt, character in Charne oceany

See also
Nicky Hunt (archer) (Nicola Hunt), archer